Linnean Society usually refers to the Linnean Society of London. Organisations with similar names include:

Australia
 Linnean Society of New South Wales

Canada
 

France
 La Société Linnéenne de la Seine maritime
 
 
 
 

Sweden
 Swedish Linnaeus Society

United States
 Linnean Society of Lake Superior
 Linnaean Society of New York